Vitula insula is a species of snout moth. It was described by Herbert H. Neunzig in 1990. It is found in the US state of California.

References

Moths described in 1990
Phycitini